The R420 road is a regional road in Ireland, which runs northwest-southeast from the R446 near Moate in County Westmeath to the R445 just west of Monasterevin. The road travels through the towns of Clara, Tullamore & Portarlington.

Details
The R420 commences at a roundabout junction on the R446 road east of Moate, County Westmeath. From here the road continues in a south east direction where it forms junction 6 on the M6 motorway which connects Dublin and Galway. Continuing southeastwards the route reaches Clara and Tullamore. Much of this section of the route is good quality, with good alignment and wide hard shoulders. The route continues through Tullamore and takes the following route, Clara Road, Kilbride Street, Patrick Street, Church Street and Church road (as far as the roundabout on the N52 bypass of Tullamore). The road continues southeastwards and continues towards Geashill, Clonygowan and Portarlington where it continues through the town as Gracefield Road, Patrick Street, Link Road & Bracklone Street. The route continues for a short distance before joining the R445 road, west of Monasterevin.

Prior to the opening of the N52 bypass of Tullamore the route of the R420 between Tullamore and Moate formed part of the N80 National secondary road. The section of road was downgraded in status with traffic (when approaching Tullamore from the south) now encouraged to take the N52 to Kilbeggan and join the M6 motorway to continue their journey.

See also
Roads in Ireland
National primary road
National secondary road

References
Roads Act 1993 (Classification of Regional Roads) Order 2006 – Department of Transport

Regional roads in the Republic of Ireland
Roads in County Offaly
Roads in County Laois